The 1995–96 VCU Rams men's basketball team represented Virginia Commonwealth University during the 1995–96 NCAA Division I men's basketball season. It was the 28th season of the University fielding a men's basketball program, and the program's first season in the Colonial Athletic Association, after previously playing in the Metro Conference. The Rams were coached by 7th year head coach, Sonny Smith.

The 1995-96 season was the first season in 11 years that the Rams earned a berth into the NCAA Division I men's basketball tournament. The Rams won an automatic berth by winning the 1996 CAA men's basketball tournament, beating UNC Wilmington in the final. VCU's Bernard Hopkins won the CAA Tournament MVP Award.

In the NCAA Tournament, VCU entered as a 12-seed, where they played in the Southeast Regional bracket. The Rams lost to eventual Final Four contestant, Mississippi State 58-51 in the first round. The Rams would not return to the NCAA Tournament again until 2004.

Schedule 

|-
!colspan=12 style="background:#000000; color:#FFFFFF; border:2px solid #FFBA00;"| Non-conference regular season

|-
!colspan=12 style="background:#000000; color:#FFFFFF; border:2px solid #FFBA00;"| CAA regular season
|-

|-
!colspan=12 style="background:#000000; color:#FFFFFF; border:2px solid #FFBA00;"| CAA tournament
|-

|-
!colspan=12 style="background:#000000; color:#FFFFFF; border:2px solid #FFBA00;"| NCAA tournament
|-

|-
|}

External links 

 Results

Vcu
Vcu
VCU Rams men's basketball seasons